Myanmar has been under the rule of repressive authoritarian military regimes since 1962. After the 1974 Socialist constitution was suspended in 1988, constitutional protection of religious freedom has not existed, after the bloody suppression of the 8888 Uprising. The authorities generally permitted most adherents of registered religious groups to worship as they choose; however, the government imposed restrictions on certain religious activities and is accused of abusing the right to freedom of religion.

Basic facts

Myanmar has a population of 54 million (2009 est.), of which 90% profess Theravada Buddhism (49 million), 4% Christianity (1.65 million Baptists and 550,000 Roman Catholics), 4% Islam (2.2 million), 1% Hinduism (550,000), and the remaining 1% consists of Mahayana Buddhism, Vajrayana Buddhism and Animism.

Accusations

The government is accused of actively promoting Theravada Buddhism (practised by 90% of the population) over other religions, particularly among members of ethnic minorities. Christian and Islamic groups continued to have trouble obtaining permission to repair existing places of worship or build new ones. Anti-Muslim violence continued, as did the close monitoring of Muslim activities. Although there were no new reports of forced conversions of non-Buddhists, the government applied pressure on students and poor youth to convert to Buddhism. Adherence or conversion to Buddhism is generally a prerequisite for promotion to senior government and military ranks.

Evangelism is banned, although Sunday schools and church activities are not affected.

Religious demography

The popular form of Buddhism in Myanmar is Theravada Buddhism with a mixture of astrology, numerology, fortune-telling, and veneration of indigenous pre-Buddhist era deities called "nats". Buddhist monks, including novices, number more than 400,000 and depend on the laity for their material needs, including clothing and daily donations of food. A small population of Buddhist nuns also exist. The principal minority religious groups include Christian groups (mostly Baptists (~70%) and Roman Catholics (~25%), and a small number of Anglicans, and an array of other Protestant denominations), Muslims (mostly Sunni), Hindus, and practitioners of traditional Chinese and indigenous religions. According to official statistics, almost 90 percent of the population practice Buddhism, 6 percent practice Christianity, and 4 percent practice Islam. The US government claims that the numbers might be distorted in favor of Buddhists, however, this cannot be verified. There is also a tiny Jewish community in Yangon, of about 25 adherents and a synagogue, but there is no resident rabbi to conduct services.

The country is ethnically diverse, with some correlation between ethnicity and religion. Theravada Buddhism is the dominant religion among the majority Burman ethnic group and among the Shan, Arakanese, and Mon ethnic minorities of the eastern, western, and southern regions. Christianity is the dominant religion among the Chin ethnic group of the Western region and has some adherents amongst the Kachin and Naga ethnic groups, whom continue to practice traditional indigenous religions. Christianity is also practised widely among the Karen and Karenni ethnic groups of the southern and eastern regions, although many Karen and Karenni are Buddhist. In addition, some ethnic Indians are Christian. Hinduism is practised chiefly by Burmese of Indian origin, who are concentrated in major cities and in the south central region. Islam is practised widely in Rakhine State, where it is the dominant religion of the Rohingya minority, and in Rangoon, Ayeyarwady, Magway, and Mandalay Divisions. Some Burmans, Indians, and ethnic Bengalis also practice Islam. Chinese ethnic minorities generally practice traditional Chinese religions. Traditional indigenous beliefs are practised widely among smaller ethnic groups in the highland regions. Practices drawn from those indigenous beliefs persist widely in popular Buddhist rituals, especially in rural areas.

Status of religious freedom

Legal and policy framework

Highly authoritarian military regimes have ruled the country since 1962. The current military government, the State Peace and Development Council (SPDC), has governed without a constitution or legislature since 1988. Most adherents of religious groups that register with the authorities generally are allowed to worship as they choose; however, the Government imposes restrictions on certain religious activities and frequently abuses the right to religious freedom.

Although about 90% of the populace adhere to Theravada Buddhism and another 1% to Mahayana Buddhism, there is no official state religion. However, since independence, successive governments, both civilian and military, have supported and associated themselves conspicuously with Buddhism.
Most famous of all would be the first prime minister of independent Myanmar, U Nu. In 1961 the Government's push to make Buddhism the state religion failed due to protests by religious minorities. The Ministry of Religious Affairs includes a Department for the Promotion and Propagation of Sasana (Buddhist teaching).

State-controlled news media frequently depict or describe government officials paying homage to Buddhist monks, making donations at pagodas throughout the country, officiating at ceremonies to open, improve, restore, or maintain pagodas, and organising ostensibly voluntary "people's donations" of money, food, and uncompensated labour to build or refurbish Buddhist religious shrines throughout the country. State-owned newspapers routinely feature front-page banner slogans quoting from Buddhist scriptures. The Government has published books of Buddhist religious instruction.

The Department for the Perpetuation and Propagation of the Sasana handles the Government's relations with Buddhist monks and Buddhist schools. The Government continues to fund two state Sangha universities in Yangon and Mandalay to train Buddhist monks under the control of the state-sponsored State Monk Coordination Committee ("Sangha Maha Nayaka Committee" or SMNC). The state-sponsored International Theravada Buddhist Missionary University (ITBMU) in Yangon, was opened in 1998 to "share the country's knowledge of Buddhism with the people of the world." The main language of instruction is English. The University also teaches non-citizens about Theravada Buddhism.

Since the 1960s Christian and Islamic groups have had difficulty importing religious literature into the country. All publications, religious and secular, remain subjected to control and censorship. It is illegal to import translations of the Bible in indigenous languages. Officials have occasionally allowed local printing or photocopying of limited copies of religious materials, including the Qur'an (with the notation that they were for internal use only) in indigenous languages without prior approval by government censors.

Virtually all organisations, religious or otherwise, must register with the Government. A government directive exempts "genuine" religious organisations from official registration; however, in practice only registered organisations can buy or sell property or open bank accounts. These requirements lead most religious organisations to seek registration. Religious organisations register with the Ministry of Home Affairs with the endorsement of the Ministry for Religious Affairs. Leaders of registered religious groups have more freedom to travel than leaders of unrecognised organizations and members of their congregations.

Religious affiliation is indicated on government-issued identification cards that citizens have. Citizens are also required to indicate their religion on official application forms, such as passports.

Muslims in Rakhine State, on the western coast, and particularly those of the Rohingya minority group, continued to experience the severest forms of legal, economic, educational, and social discrimination. The Government denies citizenship status to Rohingyas because their ancestors allegedly did not reside in the country at the start of British colonial rule, as required by the country's citizenship law. The Muslims assert that their presence in the area predates the British arrival by several centuries. On 2 April 2007, five U.N. Special Rapporteurs and an Independent Expert called on the Government to repeal or amend its 1982 Citizenship Law to insure compliance with international human rights obligations. Without citizenship status, Rohingyas do not have access to secondary education in state-run schools because the Government reserves secondary education for citizens only,

Official public holidays include numerous Buddhist holy days in accordance to the Buddhist majority, as well as some Christian, Hindu, and Islamic holy days.

The Government made some efforts to promote mutual understanding among practitioners of different religious groups.

In October 2006 Minister of Religious Affairs Brigadier General Thura Myint Maung, invited leaders from the four main religious groups (Buddhist, Muslim, Christian and Hindu) to a meeting in which the Minister denounced the 2006 Annual Report on International Religious Freedom. He told the religious leaders they knew there was freedom of religion in the country and claimed the Government always granted permits for religious gatherings and permitted renovations of mosques and churches. The Muslim leaders reportedly asked the Minister to unseal mosques in the central region that the Government closed following communal riots in earlier years and for permission to complete madrassahs that were under construction. The leaders reportedly were required to sign statements that they enjoyed religious freedom and were requested to write a letter stating that their religious communities were allowed to practice their faith freely in the country, which the ministry would display on its official website. During a discussion that followed, the representatives of the Islamic Religious Affairs Council (IRAC) stated that while there had been progress on some religious matters, there was room for further improvement. The Minister reportedly stopped further discussion and adjourned the meeting abruptly.

Restrictions on religious freedom

The Government continued to show preference for Theravada Buddhism while controlling the organisation and restricting the activities and expression of the Buddhist clergy (Sangha), although some monks have resisted such control. Based on the 1990 Sangha Organization Law, the Government banned any organisation of Buddhist monks other than the nine state-recognized monastic orders. These nine orders submit to the authority of the SMNC, the members of which are indirectly elected by monks. Violations of this ban are punishable by immediate public defrocking, and often by criminal penalties.

According to state-owned media reports, the Union Solidarity and Development Association (USDA), a government-sponsored mass organisation in which participation often is compulsory, organised courses in Buddhist culture attended by millions of persons. It was not possible to verify this claim independently.

There are reports that the ITBMU, while in principle open to the public, accepted only candidates who were approved by government authorities or recommended by a senior, progovernment Buddhist abbot.

The Government infiltrated or monitored the meetings and activities of virtually all organisations, including religious organisations. The meetings and activities of religious groups were also subject to broad government restrictions on freedom of expression and association. The Government subjected all media, including religious publications, and on occasion sermons, to control and censorship.

During the reporting period, the Government harassed a group of Buddhist worshippers who visited the Shwedagon Pagoda in Rangoon every Tuesday, the day of the week that Aung San Suu Kyi was born, to pray at the Tuesday pillar for her release and the release of all political prisoners in the country. Authorities sometimes used the pro-regime USDA to block the group from entering the pagoda grounds and make them pray outside the entrance or to shout and clap loudly to drown out their prayers. After Naw Ohn Hla, the spokesperson for the worshippers, protested to the pagoda authorities and wrote letters to regime leaders, local authorities again allowed the group access to the pagoda to pray; however, authorities ordered the pagoda janitors to throw buckets of water on the platform around the Tuesday pillar so that the worshippers would have to kneel in water. They also played music through loudspeakers at full volume to drown out the sound of the group's prayers. Despite official harassment, including physical and verbal abuse by the pro-regime USDA and the People's Militia (Myanmar), the worshippers continued to pray every Tuesday during the reporting period. In May 2007 many more groups began praying at different pagodas on Tuesdays for Aung San Suu Kyi's release upon expiration of her detention order on 27 May.

Authorities frequently refused to approve requests for gatherings to celebrate traditional Christian and Islamic holidays and restricted the number of Muslims that could gather in one place. For instance, in satellite towns surrounding Rangoon, Muslims are only allowed to gather for worship and religious training during the major Muslim holidays. In late 2006 a prominent Muslim religious organisation planned to hold a golden jubilee in Mawlamyine, Mon State, to celebrate the founding of their organisation. After they requested permission to hold the event, the local Division Commander, Brigadier General Thet Naing Win, called representatives of all non-Buddhist religious organisations in the area to a meeting. He informed them that permission would not be granted to hold any religious functions or ceremonies due to security reasons. The Muslim organisation then altered its plans and held a low-profile ceremony to honour pilgrims who had been granted official permission by the Ministry of Religious Affairs to attend the Hajj.

On 22 March 2007, authorities detained Htin Kyaw, when he publicly protested the denial of his religious freedom to become a monk. Htin Kyaw had participated in earlier demonstrations against deteriorating economic and social conditions. Rangoon authorities then enforced a 1995 prohibition against any opposition political party member from being ordained as a monk or religious leader and forbade the abbot of a monastery in North Okkalapa in Rangoon to ordain Htin Kyaw.

On 23 January 2007, Christian Solidarity Worldwide (CSW) released a report that documented the Government's restrictions, discrimination, and persecution against Christians in the country for more than a decade. Subsequently, the Ministry of Religious Affairs pressured religious organisations in the country to publish statements in government-controlled media denying they had any connection with CSW or to condemn the report, and to reject the idea that religious discrimination existed in the country.

The Government continued to discriminate against members of minority religious groups, restricting their educational, proselytising, and church-building activities.

Government authorities continued to prohibit Christian clergy from proselytising in some areas. Christian groups reported that several times during the period covered by this report, local authorities denied applications for residency permits of known Christian ministers attempting to move into a new township. The groups indicated this was not a widespread practice, but depended on the individual community and local council. In some instances, local authorities reportedly confiscated National Identity Cards of new converts to Christianity. Despite this, Christian groups reported that church membership grew, even in predominantly Buddhist regions of the country.

During the reporting period, authorities in the Rangoon area closed several house churches because they did not have proper authorisation to hold religious meetings. Other Rangoon home churches remained operational only after paying bribes to local officials. At the same time, the authorities made it difficult, although not impossible, to obtain approval for the construction of "authorized" churches.

On 1 October 2006, the Agape Zomi Baptist Church, with more than 1,000 members, had to stop its weekly services at Asia Plaza Hotel in Rangoon after the hotel management refused to continue renting them a conference room. The hotel management claimed the township authorities had ordered them to stop renting its facility to the group, which had worshipped at the hotel for approximately one year.

In August 2006 NaSaKa, the Government's border security force, ordered eight Rohingya Muslim communities in Rathedaung Township, Rakhine State to close their religious centres, including 5 mosques, 4 madrassahs, 18 moqtobs (premadrassahs), and 3 hafez khanas (Qur'an reciting centres). Later, local authorities allowed two madrassahs to reopen. NaSaKa ordered the closures because it stated that the institutions were not officially registered. According to Muslim sources, government officials have not allowed any madrassahs to register officially. Muslim religious organisations are appealing the closures.

On 19 August 2006, government officials prohibited a Baptist church in Rangoon from conducting a literacy workshop for its youth. The authorities stated that the church must seek advance permission to hold such programs, although the church had held similar programs for the past four years without needing permission. Authorities also reportedly censored the same Baptist church's weekly order of service.

In February 2006 Insein Township authorities also ordered a Chin evangelist to stop holding worship services in his house church in Aung San ward. In November 2005 authorities in Insein Township, Rangoon, pressured evangelical Christians of the 20-year-old Phawkkan Evangelical Church to sign "no worship" agreements. Some signed the agreements out of fear, but others refused. In February 2006 the authorities issued an order banning worship at the church.

The Religious Affairs Ministry has stipulated in the past that permission to construct new religious buildings "depends upon the population of the location;" however, there appeared to be no correlation between the construction of pagodas and the demand for additional places of Buddhist worship. In most regions of the country, Christian and Islamic groups that sought to build small places of worship on side streets or other inconspicuous locations were able to do so only with informal approval from local authorities; however, informal approval from local authorities created a tenuous legal situation. When local authorities or conditions have changed, informal approvals for construction have been rescinded abruptly and construction halted. In some cases, authorities demolished existing church buildings.

Christian groups continued to have trouble obtaining permission to buy land or build new churches in most regions. Sometimes the authorities refused because they claimed the churches did not possess proper property deeds, but access to official land titles was extremely difficult due to the country's complex land laws and government title to most land. In some areas, permission to repair existing places of worship was easier to acquire. Muslims reported that the authorities banned them from constructing new mosques anywhere in the country, and they had great difficulty obtaining permission to repair or expand their existing structures. Historical mosques in Mawlamyine, Mon State, Sittwe, Rakhine State, and other areas of the country continued to deteriorate because authorities would not allow routine maintenance. Some authorities reportedly destroyed informal houses of worship or unauthorised religious construction they discovered. In early 2007, Muslims in Northern Rakhine State, repaired a mosque that had been severely damaged in a storm. When the authorities discovered this, they destroyed the repairs that had been made to the mosque. Buddhist groups have not experienced similar difficulties in obtaining permission to build new pagodas, monasteries, or community religious halls.

During the reporting period, the Catholic Church established new dioceses in Kachin and Shan states. The bishop of the new diocese in Pekon, Shan State, decided to build his residence on a plot of land long owned by the church. Brigadier General Myo Lwin, commander of Military Operation Command Seven at Pekon, ordered the partially built structure demolished, confiscated the land, and extended his own compound fence to enclose the church property. Despite appeals to higher authorities, the Church has not recovered its property.

The Myanmar Institute of Theology (MIT) in Insein Township, Rangoon is the premier seminary for Baptists throughout the country. To accommodate a rapidly increasing enrolment, MIT raised funds to build a new classroom building and purchase building supplies. At the last minute, government officials refused to grant a building permit. Four years later, piles of construction materials still litter the campus where they gather mildew and rust. In contrast, the Government openly supports Buddhist seminaries and permits them to build large campuses.

Some Christians in Chin State claimed that the authorities have not authorised the construction of any new churches since 1997. However, newly built churches are evident in several parts of the state. A Christian leader in Chin State stated that to obtain permission to repair or build a church he first had to obtain permission from the Ministry of Religious Affairs, the Ministry of Progress of Border Areas and National Races and Development Affairs (NaTaLa), the Immigration Department and the Township Peace and Development Committee. In Rangoon, Mandalay, and elsewhere, authorities allowed construction of new community centres by various Christian groups only if they agreed not to hold services there or erect Christian signs.

It remained extremely difficult for Muslims to get permission to repair existing mosques, although internal renovations were allowed in some cases. In some parts of Rakhine State, authorities cordoned off mosques and forbade Muslims to worship in them.

State censorship authorities continued to enforce special restrictions on local publication of the Bible, the Qur'an, and Christian and Islamic publications in general. The most onerous restriction was a list of more than 100 prohibited words that the censors would not allow in Christian or Islamic literature because they are "indigenous terms" or derived from the Pali language long used in Buddhist literature. Many of these words have been used and accepted by some of the country's Christian and Islamic groups since the colonial period. Organizations that translate and publish non-Buddhist religious texts were appealing these restrictions. In addition, censors have sometimes objected to passages of the Old Testament and the Qur'an that they believe approve the use of violence against nonbelievers. There have been no reports of arrests or prosecutions for possession of any traditional religious literature in recent years.

Authorities also restricted the quantity of bibles and Qur'ans brought into the country. During the reporting period, however, individuals continued to carry Bibles and Qur'ans into the country in small quantities for personal use. There were no reports that authorities intercepted or confiscated Qur'ans at border entry points, but religious leaders complained that postal workers steal them to sell on the black market.

In general, the Government has not allowed permanent foreign religious missions to operate in the country since the mid-1960s, when it expelled nearly all foreign missionaries and nationalised all private schools and hospitals, which were extensive and affiliated mostly with Christian religious organisations. The Government is not known to have paid any compensation in connection with these extensive confiscations. Christian groups, including Catholics and Protestants, have brought in foreign clergy and religious workers for visits as tourists, but they have been careful to ensure that the Government did not perceive their activities as proselytising. Some Christian theological seminaries also continued to operate, as did several Bible schools and madrassahs. The Government has allowed some members of foreign religious groups, such as the Church of Jesus Christ of Latter-day Saints (Mormons), to enter the country to provide humanitarian assistance or English language training to government officials. Some of these groups did not register with the Myanmar Council of Churches, but were able to conduct religious services without government interference.

The Government allowed members of all religious groups to establish and maintain links with coreligionists in other countries and to travel abroad for religious purposes, subject to the country's restrictive passport and visa issuance practices, foreign exchange controls, and government monitoring, which extended to all international activities by all citizens regardless of religion. The Government sometimes expedited its burdensome passport issuance procedures for Muslims making the Hajj or Buddhists going on pilgrimage to Bodhgaya, India, although it limited the number of pilgrims. In 2006 government officials allowed approximately 3,000 Muslims to participate in the Hajj. The procedure reportedly became more cumbersome in 2006 due to the relocation of most government offices from Rangoon to Nay Pyi Taw. Observers speculate that had this not been the case, more Muslims would have gone. During the period covered by this report, immigration and passport officials continued to use the occasion of the Hajj to extort bribes from would-be travellers. Government and private travel agencies processed approximately 2,500 Buddhist pilgrims to travel to Bodhgaya in India.

Non-Buddhists continued to experience employment discrimination at upper levels of the public sector. Few have ever been promoted to the level of Director General or higher. There were no non-Buddhists who held flag rank in the armed forces, although a few Christians reportedly achieved the rank of lieutenant colonel. The Central Executive Committee of the largest opposition group—the National League for Democracy—also included no non-Buddhists, although individual members from most religious groups in the country supported the party. The Government discouraged Muslims from enlisting in the military, and Christian or Muslim military officers who aspired for promotion beyond the rank of major were encouraged by their superiors to convert to Buddhism. Some Muslims who wished to join the military reportedly had to list "Buddhist" as their religion on their application, though they were not required to convert.

Rohingya Muslims, although essentially treated as illegal foreigners, were not issued Foreigner Registration Cards. Instead, the Government gave some of them "Temporary Registration Cards" (TRC). UNHCR estimated that only 650,000 of the approximately 800,000 Rohingyas possessed TRCs. Authorities have insisted that Muslim men applying for TRCs submit photos without beards. The authorities did not allow government employees of the Islamic faith, including village headmen, to grow beards, and dismissed some who already had beards. The authorities also did not consider many non-Rohingya Muslims to be citizens. In order for these Muslims to receive National Registration Cards and passports, they must pay large bribes. Ethnic Burman Muslims pay less than Muslims from ethnic minority groups (primary those of Indian or Bengali descent).

In 2006 a prominent Muslim religious organisation asked the Rakhine State Peace and Development Council Chairman, the Regional Military Commander, and the Ministry of Religious Affairs to lift marriage restrictions for Rohingya Muslims in Rakhine State. At the end of the reporting period, they had yet to receive a response.

In Rangoon, Muslims can usually obtain birth certificates for newborns, but local authorities refused to allow them to place the names of the babies on their household registers.

Authorities generally did not grant permission to Rohingya or Muslim Arakanese to travel from their hometowns for any purpose; however, permission was sometimes obtainable through bribery. Non-Arakanese Muslims were given more freedom to travel; however, they were also required to seek permission, which was usually granted after a bribe is paid. Muslims residing in Rangoon could visit beach resort areas in Thandwe, Rakhine State, but could not return to Rangoon without the signature of the Regional Military Commander. Those with money were able to bribe local officials to return. Muslims residing outside of Rakhine State often were barred from return travel to their homes if they visit other parts of Rakhine State.

Rohingyas did not have access to state-run schools beyond primary education and were unable to obtain employment in any civil service positions. Muslim students from Rakhine State who completed high school were not granted permits to travel outside the state to attend college or university. In lieu of a diploma, Rohingya high school graduates received a sheet of paper that stated they would receive a diploma upon presentation of a citizenship card; however, Rohingyas can never obtain such a card.

Many of the approximately 25,000 Rohingya Muslims remaining in refugee camps in Bangladesh refused to return because they feared human rights abuses, including religious persecution.

Abuses of religious freedom
Aung San Suu Kyi, leader of the opposition National League for Democracy (NLD), has been in prison or house arrest since 2003, when forces allied with the Government attacked her and her convoy, which included several NLD-allied monks, while travelling in Sagaing Division in the northwestern region of the country. The Government reportedly used criminals dressed in monks' robes in the ambush. On 15 May, authorities detained more than 30 worshippers in Rangoon when they approached separate pagodas to pray for Aung San Suu Kyi and other political prisoners. At the end of the reporting period, the worshippers were still detained. The next day USDA members, claiming to represent "the people," detained another 15 worshippers after they prayed at a pagoda in Mingladon Township, but the authorities let them go the same day. On 25 May 2007, the Government extended Aung San Suu Kyi's house arrest for an additional year.

In February 2007 the Burmese Army arrested a monk who was allegedly trading Buddha images to Buddhists in Bangladesh illegally. The army forced the monk to disrobe in contravention to Buddhist precepts that require a monk to have his robes removed at a ceremony in a monastery. Laypersons, regardless of status, may not demote a monk to become a layperson.

On 2 July 2006, authorities from Thandwe, Rakhine State arrested Abbot Wila Tha and his assistant Than Kakesa from the Buddhist monastery of U Shwe Maw village, Taungup Township, closed the monastery, and forced 59 monks and novices to leave. Local sources claimed that the reason for the arrest was that the abbot refused to accept donations from or conduct religious ceremonies for the authorities. The authorities also claimed the abbot was endangering local stability by talking to the monks and novices about democracy, that he was a supporter of the NLD (National League for Democracy), and that he had supported the visit of Aung San Suu Kyi (pro-democracy activist and leader of the NLD) when she visited the area several years earlier. The exile-based Assistance Association for Political Prisoners (AAPP) estimated there were 86 Buddhist monks in prison for various charges. It was not possible to verify the AAPP estimate. The number of non-Buddhists in prison for their religious beliefs was unknown. Authorities usually defrocked monks when they arrested them and treated them like ordinary prisoners, including using torture. The prison authorities disrespectfully addressed the monks by their given names, not their religious titles.

Local civilian and military authorities continued to take actions against Christian groups: arresting clergy, closing home churches, and prohibiting religious services.

In February 2006, police at Hpa-an, Karen State, arrested Yeh Zaw, a member of the Phawkkan Evangelical Church. Yeh Zaw had earlier written a letter to the regime leader urging him to end the persecution of his church that Rangoon authorities closed earlier in 2006, banning members from worshipping there. Police charged him with travelling without an identity card.

In 2005 local authorities in the Chin State capital of Hakha notified Baptist leaders that they would be forced to relocate an active, historic cemetery from church property to a remote location outside of town. Religious leaders reported that authorities continued to forcefully relocate cemeteries in many parts of the country.

In the past, pagodas or government buildings often have been built on confiscated Muslim land.

In Kachin State, authorities have constructed Buddhist shrines in Christian communities where few or no Buddhists reside and have tried to coerce Christians into forced labour to carry bricks and other supplies for the shrine's construction. In September 2006 government officials inaugurated a pagoda near the Kachin Independence Organization's headquarters at Laiza, Kachin State. Kachin sources reported there were no Buddhists living in the community. In northern Rakhine State, authorities frequently forced Rohingyas to help construct Buddhist shrines, even though Buddhists there account for approximately 2 percent of the population.

In January 2006 Muslim Rohingyas from at least ten surrounding villages claimed the military forced them to carry building supplies for three model villages at Padauk Myin, Mala Myin and Thaza Myin in Rathedaung Township. Certain townships in the Rakhine State, such as Thandwe, Gwa, and Taungup, were declared "Muslim-free zones" by government decree in 1983.

Authorities have attempted to prevent Chin Christians from practising their religion. In 2005 the military commander in Matupi Township, Chin State, ordered the destruction of a 30-foot cross erected on a hillside with government permission in 1999. A more senior military official subsequently told local church authorities that they could get permission to reconstruct the cross; however, the local pastors have thus far refused to ask for such authorisation. In the past, these crosses often have been replaced with pagodas, sometimes built with forced labour.

SPDC authorities continued to "dilute" ethnic minority populations by encouraging, or even forcing, Buddhist Burmans to relocate to ethnic areas. In predominantly Muslim northern Rakhine State, authorities established "model villages" to relocate released ethnic Burman criminals from other parts of the country.

There continued to be credible reports from diverse regions of the country that government officials compelled persons, Buddhists and non-Buddhists alike, especially in rural areas, to contribute money, food, or materials to state-sponsored projects to build, renovate, or maintain Buddhist religious shrines or monuments. The Government denied that it used coercion and called these contributions "voluntary donations" consistent with Buddhist ideas of making merit. In April 2006 authorities in Lashio reportedly tried to coerce merchants to contribute large sums to construct a Buddhist shrine. Christian merchants refused to participate and the funds raised were well below the authorities' target.

Forced religious conversion
Muslim and Christian community leaders reported that during the period covered by this report, authorities had moved away from a campaign of forced conversion to Buddhism and instead focused on enticing non-Buddhists to convert to Buddhism by offering charity or bribery. Conversion of non-Buddhists, coerced or otherwise, is part of a longstanding government campaign to "Burmanize" ethnic minority regions. This campaign has coincided with increased military presence and pressure. In 2005 there was a single, unverified report of forced conversion at gunpoint in Chin State; however, Christian groups reported that such violent cases were less frequent than in earlier years. In September 2006 Chin sources reported that 15 students withdrew from a government-operated hostel for girls in Matupi, Chin State, after formerly voluntary Buddhist evening prayers became compulsory for all the hostel residents. Although the girls received free school fees, food, and accommodation, they complained they felt pressured to become Buddhist. Also in many state schools of Burma, students are to recite Buddhist prayers every morning. In Kanpetlet, Chin State, NaTaLa operated a school exclusively for Buddhist students and guaranteed them government jobs after graduation. Christian children had to agree to convert to Buddhism if they wanted to attend this school.

There were no reports of forced religious conversion of minor US citizens who had been abducted or illegally removed from the United States, or of the refusal to allow such citizens to return to the United States.

Societal abuses and discrimination

Preferential treatment for Buddhists and widespread prejudice against ethnic Indians, particularly ethnic Rohingya Muslims, were key sources of social tensions between the Buddhist majority and Christian and Muslim minorities.

In February 2006, violent clashes broke out between Muslims and Buddhists in Magway Division in response to rumours that Muslim men had raped a Burman woman. Ethnic Burmans attacked and torched Muslim and ethnic Indian homes, shops, and mosques. Rioting and looting spread to surrounding towns, including Chauk and Salin. Local security forces did not intervene at first, but as violence spread authorities imposed a strict curfew in several towns. Reliable sources stated that the authorities arrested 17 people in Sinbyukyun and another 55 persons in Chauk, mostly Muslims. Unofficial sources claimed that 3 people died and another 10 were injured in the riots. Three mosques in Yenangyaung, Chauk, and Saku were reportedly destroyed in the violence. At the end of the reporting period, the mosques remained sealed and authorities would not permit Muslims to rebuild them, nor did authorities conduct inquiries into the attacks. Christians reported that an entire Muslim village fled to the monastery of a trusted Buddhist abbot near Shwe Settaw to seek refuge during the riots.

These attacks follow earlier communal violence in Kyauk Pyu, Rakhine State, in 2005. During several days of violence, two Muslims were killed and one Buddhist monk was severely injured. Some Islamic groups blamed the Government for trying to increase tensions between Buddhists and Muslims as part of a "divide and rule" strategy.

Since 1994, when Buddhist members split away from the KNU (Karen National Union) to organise the pro-government Democratic Karen Buddhist Army (DKBA), there have been armed conflicts between the DKBA and the predominantly Christian antigovernment KNU. Although the DKBA reportedly includes some Christians and there are some Buddhists in the KNU, the armed conflict between the two Karen groups has had strong religious overtones. There were also unverified reports that DKBA authorities continued to expel villagers who converted to Christianity.

During the reporting period, a Burmese language document surfaced titled, "Program to Eliminate Christianity." The document suggested 17 points for countering Christianity in the country; however, the source of the document was unknown and several grammatical errors raised questions about its authenticity. There was no definite evidence to link the document to the Government.

See also

 Religion in Burma
 Human rights in Burma

References

 United States Bureau of Democracy, Human Rights and Labor. Burma: International Religious Freedom Report 2007. This article incorporates text from this source, which is in the public domain.

Myanmar
Human rights in Myanmar
Religion in Myanmar